There are many landmarks in Istanbul. The historic areas of Istanbul are cited as UNESCO World Heritage Site.

Attractions

Buildings, monuments and landmarks

Topkapı Palace
Fountain of Ahmed III
Hippodrome of Constantinople
Serpent Column
Obelisk of Theodosius
Walled Obelisk
German Fountain
Basilica Cistern
Milion
Grand Bazaar
Egyptian Bazaar
Galata Bridge
Tünel
Istiklal Avenue
Cité de Péra
Mısır Apartment
Pera Palace Hotel
Republic Monument
Caferağa Medresseh
Rumelihisarı
Anadoluhisarı
Yedikule Fortress
Yoros Castle
Valens Aqueduct
Walls of Constantinople
Palace of Blachernae
Palace of the Porphyrogenitus
Column of Marcian
Column of Constantine
Column of the Goths
Cistern of Mocius
Cistern of Aetius
Cistern of Philoxenos
Theodosius Cistern
Cistern of Aspar
Cistern of the Hebdomon
Prison of Anemas
Monastery of Stoudios
Dolmabahçe Palace
Çırağan Palace
Beylerbeyi Palace
Küçüksu Palace
Aynalıkavak Palace
Ihlamur Palace
Khedive Palace
Esma Sultan Mansion
Haydarpaşa Terminal
Sirkeci Terminal
Sublime Porte
Süreyya Opera House

Mosques, Churches and Synagogues

Sultanahmet Mosque 
New Mosque
Eyüp Sultan Mosque
Fatih Mosque
Bayezid II Mosque
Zeyrek Mosque
Arap Mosque
Gül Mosque
Bodrum Mosque
Vefa Kilise Mosque
Eski Imaret Mosque
Fethiye Mosque
Kalenderhane Mosque
Fenari Isa Mosque
Little Hagia Sophia
Hirami Ahmet Pasha Mosque
Koca Mustafa Pasha Mosque
Rum Mehmed Pasha Mosque
Firuz Ağa Mosque
Vasat Atik Ali Pasha Mosque
Gazi Atik Ali Pasha Mosque
Yavuz Selim Mosque
Süleymaniye Mosque
Şehzade Mosque
Mihrimah Sultan Mosque (Edirnekapı)
Mihrimah Sultan Mosque (Üsküdar)
Sokollu Mehmed Pasha Mosque
Piyale Pasha Mosque
Rüstem Pasha Mosque
Şemsi Pasha Mosque
Atik Valide Mosque
Molla Çelebi Mosque
Zal Mahmud Pasha Mosque
Kılıç Ali Pasha Complex
Haseki Sultan Complex
Sinan Pasha Mosque
Laleli Mosque
Yeni Valide Mosque
Nuruosmaniye Mosque
Zeynep Sultan Mosque
Teşvikiye Mosque
Küçük Mecidiye Mosque
Ortaköy Mosque
Dolmabahçe Mosque
Yıldız Hamidiye Mosque
Pertevniyal Valide Sultan Mosque
Nusretiye Mosque
Church of St. Anthony of Padua, Istanbul
Church of St. Mary Draperis, Istanbul
Cathedral of the Holy Spirit
Church of SS Peter and Paul, Istanbul
Church of Saint Benoit, Istanbul
Crimea Memorial Church
Hagia Triada Greek Orthodox Church, Istanbul
Church of St. Mary of the Mongols
Ecumenical Patriarchate of Constantinople
Church of St. George
Church of St. Mary of the Spring (Istanbul)
Church of St. Mary of Blachernae (Istanbul)
Monastery of the Transfiguration, Kinaliada
Bulgarian St. Stephen Church
Armenian Patriarchate of Constantinople
Church of St. George of Samatya
Neve Shalom Synagogue
Ashkenazi Synagogue of Istanbul
Ahrida Synagogue of Istanbul
Italian Synagogue (Istanbul)

Towers
Towers in Istanbul
Beyazıt Tower
Dolmabahçe Clock Tower
Endem TV Tower
Etfal Hospital Clock Tower
Galata Tower
Maiden's Tower
Nusretiye Clock Tower
Yıldız Clock Tower

Museums
Museums in Istanbul

Hagia Sophia
Hagia Irene
Chora Church
Istanbul Archaeology Museums
Great Palace Mosaic Museum
Turkish and Islamic Arts Museum
Istanbul Naval Museum
Istanbul Modern
Yıldız Palace
The Museum of Innocence
Sakıp Sabancı Museum
Sadberk Hanım Museum
Rahmi M. Koç Museum
Rezan Has Museum
Istanbul Military Museum 
SALT (institution)
Pera Museum
SantralIstanbul
Miniatürk
Jewish Museum of Turkey
Tiled Kiosk
İstanbul Toy Museum
Istanbul Postal Museum
Adam Mickiewicz Museum, Istanbul
Galatasaray Museum
Istanbul Railway Museum
Doğançay Museum
Aşiyan Museum
Istanbul Aviation Museum
Museum of Illumination and Heating Appliances
Florya Atatürk Marine Mansion

Bath houses
Haseki Hürrem Sultan Hamamı
Çemberlitaş Hamamı
Bayezid II Hamamı
Cağaloğlu Hamam
Galatasaray Hamamı
Ağa Hamamı

Parks and gardens
 Avcıkoru Nature Park
 Belgrad Forest
 Emirgan Park
 Fethi Paşa Korusu
 Gülhane Park
 Kartal Park
 Miniatürk
 Taksim Gezi Park
 Yıldız Park

Schools
Schools in Istanbul

Istanbul University
Galatasaray High School
Istanbul High School
Kabataş Erkek Lisesi
Kadıköy Anadolu Lisesi
Cağaloğlu Anadolu Lisesi
Robert College
Kuleli Military High School
Turkish Naval High School
St. George's Austrian High School
St. Joseph High School (Istanbul)
Liceo Italiano
Deutsche Schule Istanbul
Zografeion Lyceum
Halki Seminary
Phanar Greek Orthodox College
Üsküdar American Academy
Istanbul Technical University
Galatasaray University
Boğaziçi University
Marmara University
Mimar Sinan Fine Arts University

Shopping and commercial districts
İstiklal Avenue
Kadıköy
Nişantaşı
Bebek
Ortaköy
Bağdat Avenue

Shopping malls
Shopping malls in Istanbul
Akmerkez
Istanbul Cevahir
İstinye Park
Kanyon
Zorlu Center

Sports venues
Sport facilities in Istanbul
Istanbul Park
Nef Stadium
Vodafone Park
Şükrü Saracoğlu Stadium
Atatürk Olympic Stadium
Abdi İpekçi Arena
Sinan Erdem Dome
Ataköy Athletics Arena
Ülker Sports Arena
Veliefendi Race Course

Landmarks
Tourist attractions in Istanbul